The University of Calgary Faculty of Medicine was established in 1967 and renamed the Cumming School of Medicine in 2014. It is one of two medical schools in Alberta and one of 17 in Canada. The Faculty and medical school is linked to the hospitals in Alberta Health Services such as Foothills Medical Centre, Alberta Children's Hospital, Rockyview General Hospital and Chinook Regional Hospital. Trainees in faculty of medicine include 486 medical students (UME), 767 residents (PGME), 190 post doctoral fellows (PDF) and 491 graduate students. It is one of two 3 year medical schools, along with McMaster University Medical School, in Canada. In addition, the University of Calgary Cumming School of Medicine offers an undergraduate Bachelor of Health Sciences degree and a Bachelor of Community Rehabilitation and Disability Studies degree.

Program offerings
Doctor of Medicine (MD)
Leaders in Medicine (Joint MD/Graduate Degree Program)
Bachelor of Health Sciences (BHSc)
Bachelor of Community Rehabilitation and Disability Studies (BCR)
Neurological Sciences and Mental Health 
Cardiovascular and Respiratory Sciences
Pathology 
Immunology
Community Health Sciences
Gastrointestinal Sciences
Medical Sciences Graduate Division of Education
Microbiology and Infectious Diseases

Doctor of Medicine program

The Doctor of Medicine program was founded in 1970. It is one of two fully accredited medical schools in Canada that offers a three-year Doctor of Medicine program. The program is structured so that the pre-clerkship curriculum is taught year-round, without an extended summer break (as is common in 4-year MD programs). This structure allows the pre-clerkship portion of undergraduate medical education to be shortened in length, without limiting the breadth of medical knowledge required for students to be competent before entering the clerkship phase of the curriculum.

Menagerie
The medical school has a history of having the second-year medical students give an animal name to the first-year students, effectively welcoming them into the UofC Menagerie. An incomplete list of classes includes:
1973: Guinea Pigs 
1975: Turkeys
1976: Beavers
1977: Toads
1978: Minks
1981: Lampreys
1984: Emus
1985: Wombats
1987: Slugs 
1988: Poodles
1989: Flamingos
1990: Pandas
1992: Dikdiks 
1996: Sifakas
2000: Dugongs
2001: Bonobos
2003: Geoducks
2004: Taphozous
2005: Candirus
2009: Macaques
2010: Glabers
2011: Kākāpōs
2012: Blobfish
2013: Aye-ayes
2014: Hellbenders
2015: Cows
2016: Narwhals
2017: Humuhumunukunukuapua'a (briefly Roosters)
2018: Goats
2019: Dholes
2020: Boops boops
2021: Limpkins
2022: Tanukis
2023: Echidnas
2024: Bilbies
2025: Spiny Lumpsuckers

Institutes

Thematic institutes were formed between Faculty of Medicine and the Calgary Health Region that support and fulfill the vision and mission of these two entities. Philosophically, institutes encompass activities in all three areas of education, research and care delivery.

Currently there are seven Institutes identified as follows:

McCaig Institute for Bone and Joint Health
Hotchkiss Brain Institute
Calvin, Phoebe and Joan Snyder Institute of Infection, Immunity & Inflammation
Alberta Children's Hospital Research Institute for Child and Maternal Health (ACHRI)
Libin Cardiovascular Institute of Alberta
Arnie Charbonneau Cancer Institute
O'Brien Institute for Public Health

Faculty of Medicine departments

Anaesthesia
Biochemistry and Molecular Biology
Cardiac Sciences
Cell Biology and Anatomy
Clinical Neurosciences
Community Health Sciences
Critical Care Medicine
Family Medicine
Medicine
Medical Genetics
Microbiology, Immunology and Infectious Diseases
Obstetrics and Gynaecology
Oncology
Paediatrics
Pathology and Laboratory Medicine
Physiology and Pharmacology
Psychiatry
Radiology
Surgery

Location
The faculty is located on the Foothills Campus of the University of Calgary in the Health Sciences Centre. This facility is annexed to Foothills Medical Centre.

References
Graduate Studies
Faculty of Medicine
Libin Cardiovascular Institute of Alberta

Medicine
Calgary
Educational institutions established in 1967
1967 establishments in Alberta